Sekaliporus kriegi is a species of beetle in the family Dytiscidae, the only species in the genus Sekaliporus.

References

Dytiscidae